Journal Iraq (Arabic: جورنال عراق) is the first newspaper in Ottoman Iraq and the first Arabic-language newspaper published in the Arab World. It was published by Ottoman wali Dawud Pasha in Baghdad in 1816.

See also
 List of Arab newspapers

References

Publications established in 1816
Arabic-language newspapers
Arab mass media
Newspapers published in Iraq
1816 establishments in the Ottoman Empire